Sha'aban Ibrahim Sharada is a Nigerian politician and Journalist from Kano state who was the Personal Assistant to President Muhammad Buhari before he become a Member of the House of Representatives in 2019.

Early life and education
Sha'aban was (born on 1 January,1982 Kano,Nigeria) in Sharada quarters of Kano Municipal Local Government Area of Kano State, he attended Salamta Primary School, he also attended Government Secondary Sharada. He obtained his 1st Degree in Mass Communication at Bayero University, Kano.

Journalism career
Sha'aban started his career as Marketing Assistant at Freedom Radio Nigeria in Kano State up to the time he become the Personal Assistant to President of the Federal Republic of Nigeria, Muhammad Buhari

Politics
Sha'aban started his political career 2009 during his undergraduate were he contested for the post of National Publicity Secretary of National Association of Kano State Students Association and he was first appointed as Personal Assistant to President of the Federal Republic of Nigeria, by President Muhammad Buhari in 2016 Sha'aban was elected Member in the 2019 Nigerian general election to represent Kano Municipal Federal constituency in the Nigerian House of Representative

He is currently the Chairman of House of Representatives Committee on National Security and Intelligence. He is currently contesting to be the governor of Kano state in the 2023 Kano state governorship election under the party of ADP.

References

1982 births
Living people
Politicians from Kano
People from Kano State
21st-century Nigerian politicians
Candidates in the 2019 Nigerian general election